The Wallring is a semi-circular urban ensemble encircling the inner city of Hamburg. The outer perimeter is – for the largest part – made up by a string of parks.

The Wallring follows the outline of Hamburg's old city wall, and was developed in the first half of the 19th century, when the defensive wall, the (Wallanlagen), was razed. The wall that defined the city's edge from the 1620s until the 1840s  has had a strong impact on shaping the modern city.   The Wallring park consists of several differently named sections, which — based on their common historical development — are characterized by a certain unity, but also by a number of dissimilarities. It also offers the inner city's largest network of parks, and forms a sort of connection to Hamburg's green and open spaces along Elbe and Alster.

Terminology 
Etymologically, "Wallring" is derived from the German word "Wall" for Hamburg's former fortifications. Semantically, the Wallring was originally associated with the parks, and with the parks' semi-circular unity in jeopardy, the meaning shifted to the nonetheless continuous ring road. The parks alone are otherwise also referred to as Wallanlagen or Grüner Ring. The ring road, a succession of roads, is also referred to as Inner Ring or just Ring. The department of transportation's official designation is Ring 1 (German: Ring Eins) in reference to subsequent ring roads Ring 2 and Ring 3 further out.

For its heterogeneous quality, the Wallring is being differentiated as Westlicher (Western) and Östlicher (Eastern) Wallring. While the western Wallring has a continuous park front, the eastern Wallring is marked by traffic infrastructure. Regardless of the terminology for the ring road as a whole, its individual sections have proper street names.

History 
 

The Wallring follows the course of Hamburg's former Wallanlagen (ramparts) developed by Dutch military engineer Johan van Valckenburgh between 1616 and 1625.

Former city gates 
Former city gates were Millerntor and Dammtor on the western and north-western side, Steintor on the eastern side, and Sandtor and Brooktor near the Elbe. Later additional gates were created, including Hafentor, Holstentor, Klostertor and Deichtor. The locations of all gates are still known as minor localities or zones of Hamburg.

Conversion into a public park 
By the early 19th century, the ramparts were outdated and rendered useless against foreign attacks. In 1806, Napoleon had no resistance when capturing Hamburg. The fortifications were ultimately removed between 1820 and 1837, the outer glacis were subsequently remodeled into a park by German landscape architect Isaak Altmann (1777–1837). During the 1860s, the Wallring was developed as a boulevard, with a number of representative buildings lining the inner side – among those new structures for the Kunsthalle (1869), the Oberpostdirektion (1887) and the Natural History Museum (1891) – the outer side remained unbuilt apart from a few structures placed within the park-like settings. Already in the 1840s, the circular park suffered setbacks by infringements caused by the Hamburg-Altona rail. Eventually Hamburg Hauptbahnhof was built from 1898 until 1906. In 1922 the Hamburg Museum opened in premises at Holstenwall.

During the bombing in World War II, the Natural History Museum was destroyed in 1943. Following the war, many of the former defensive ditches were filled with rubble. During the late 1950s and early 1960s, the Esplanade lost most of its northern building ensemble. Today, the western parks resembles the design of the International Garden Exhibitions (IGA) of 1963 and 1973. parts of the eastern Wallring are tunneled by the so-called Wallring Tunnel, built between 1963 and 1966.

Description of the ring segments 

The Wallring consists of the western and eastern Wallring, separated from each other by Lombard Bridge. The park continues along the bridge's feeders, while the bridge also marks the border between Neustadt and Altstadt.

Western Wallring 

Geographically, the Wallring starts at Stintfang on the Elbe shore. Traffic-wise, the Wallring starts at Millerntordamm, off Millerntorplatz.

Holstenwall 
Holstenwall, the Wallring's first section, runs up to Johannes-Brahms-Platz, named after Hamburg-born composer Johannes Brahms, and location of the Laeiszhalle. Holstenwall is flanked by Große Wallanlagen.

Gorch-Fock-Wall 
After passing Johannes-Brahms-Platz, the ring continues as Gorch-Fock-Wall, named after Hamburg-born poet Gorch Fock. It runs up to Stephansplatz, an important junction with Dammtorstraße. It is flanked by the Kleine Wallanlagen and the Old Botanical Garden (Alter Botanischer Garten).

Esplanade 

It runs from Stephansplatz to the north-western corner of Binnenalster and was developed between 1827 and 1830 according to plans by Carl Ludwig Wimmel (1786–1845). The neoclassical facades were inspired by London's Portland Place, the avenue's four lines of linden trees were modeled after Berlin's Unter den Linden. The shopping street of Colonnaden, leading to Jungfernstieg boulevard, ends here.

Lombardsbrücke 

Lombardsbrücke (Lombard Bridge) is the name of the bridge crossing the Alster River at the location of the former Alster glacis, and also the name of the two feeders, built on the former glacis. The feeders are landscaped parks, transitioning between the two Alster lakes. A first bridge at this location dated from the mid 17th century. On the bridge, the view opens up wide onto the Binnenalster, historically the Hanseatic city's "state parlour".

Eastern Wallring 
The eastern Wallring is part of Hamburg's "Museum Mile" (Museumsmeile), being home to some of the city's largest art museums. Despite this concentration of art, its outer perimeter is lacking the ring road's overriding underlying concept of a unified spatial perception and subject to redevelopment. Since the 1960s, most of the traffic on the eastern Wallring is diverted through the Wallringtunnel.

Glockengießerwall 

The outer perimeter of Glockengießerwall is home of the Renaissance Revival Kunsthalle, completed in 1869, and the Postmodern Galerie der Gegenwart, completed in 1997.

Steintorwall 
At Steintorwall, the Walling passes Hamburg Hauptbahnhof on the outer perimeter and shopping streets Spitalerstraße and Mönckebergstraße on the inner perimeter.

Klosterwall 
Klosterwall is the Wallring's last section before terminating at Zollkanal. Klosterwall passes Georgsplatz and Deichtorplatz.

Landmarks 
Both eastern and western Wallring are lined with landmarks, museums and cultural institutions.

Parks and open spaces 
 
 Alter Elbpark with Bismarck Monument 
 Große Wallanlagen
 Sievekingplatz with Hanseatic Higher Regional Court (HansOLG) 
 Kleine Wallanlagen
 Alter Botanischer Garten 
 Georg-Mahler Park with Casino Esplanade
 Binnenalster
 Hauptbahnhof

Museums and cultural institutions 

 
Museums
 Hamburg Museum
 Kunsthalle & Galerie der Gegenwart
 Museum für Kunst und Gewerbe
 Hamburg Kunstverein
 Freie Akademie der Künste 
 Deichtorhallen

Theaters and stages
 Laeiszhalle  
 Markthalle

See also 
 
 List of ring roads 
 List of cities with defensive walls

Notes

References

External links 

Hamburg-Mitte

Hamburg